Club Deportivo Valdelacalzada is a football team based in Valdelacalzada in the autonomous community of Extremadura. Founded in 1965, it plays in Tercera División - Group 14.

Season to season

15 seasons in Tercera División

External links
Futbolme team profile 

Football clubs in Extremadura
Association football clubs established in 1965
1965 establishments in Spain